Xanthomonas cynarae is a species of bacteria.

External links
Type strain of Xanthomonas cynarae at BacDive -  the Bacterial Diversity Metadatabase

Xanthomonadales